Blood on the Highway is an EP by Asphalt Ballet released by Virgin Records in 1991.  It contains five tracks that were recorded live in the studio as part of a rehearsal for their tour.

Track listing

Personnel
Gary Jeffries - Vocals and Harmonica
Terry Phillips - Bass
Julius Ulrich - Guitar
Danny Clarke - Guitar
Mikki Kiner - Drums

References

1991 EPs
Asphalt Ballet albums
1991 live albums
Virgin Records EPs
Virgin Records live albums
Live EPs